Gondophares I (Greek: Γονδοφαρης Gondopharēs, Υνδοφερρης Hyndopherrēs; Kharosthi: 𐨒𐨂𐨡𐨥𐨪 , ; 𐨒𐨂𐨡𐨥𐨪𐨿𐨣 , ; 𐨒𐨂𐨡𐨂𐨵𐨪‎) was the founder of the Indo-Parthian Kingdom and its most prominent king, ruling from 19 to 46. He probably belonged to a line of local princes who had governed the Parthian province of Drangiana since its disruption by the Indo-Scythians in c. 129 BC, and may have been a member of the House of Suren. During his reign, his kingdom became independent from Parthian authority and was transformed into an empire, which encompassed Drangiana, Arachosia, and Gandhara. He is generally known from the Acts of Thomas, the Takht-i-Bahi inscription, and  silver and copper coins bearing his visage.

He was succeeded in Drangiana and Arachosia by Orthagnes, and in Gandhara by his nephew Abdagases I.

Etymology 
The name of Gondophares was not a personal name, but an epithet derived from the Middle Iranian name 𐭅𐭉𐭍𐭃𐭐𐭓𐭍, Windafarn (Parthian), and 𐭢𐭥𐭭𐭣𐭯𐭥, Gundapar (Middle Persian), in turn derived from the Old Iranian name 𐎻𐎡𐎭𐎳𐎼𐎴𐎠 (Vindafarnâ, "May he find glory" (cf. Greek Ἰνταφέρνης, Intaphernes)), which was also the name of one of the six nobles that helped  the Achaemenid king of kings (shahanshah) Darius the Great to seize the throne. In old Armenian, it is "Gastaphar". "Gundaparnah" was apparently the Eastern Iranian form of the name.

Ernst Herzfeld claims his name is perpetuated in the name of the Afghan city Kandahar, which he founded under the name Gundopharron.

Background 

Gondophares may have been a member of the House of Suren, one of the most esteemed families in Arsacid Iran, that not only had the hereditary right to lead the royal military, but also to place the crown on the Parthian king at the coronation. In c. 129 BC, the eastern portions of the Parthian Empire, primarily Drangiana, was invaded by nomadic peoples, mainly by the Eastern Iranian Saka (Indo-Scythians) and the Indo-European Yuezhi, thus giving the rise to the name of the province of Sakastan ("land of the Saka").

The ruler of the Parthian Empire ruler Mithridates II (124–88 BCE) vanquished the Sakas of the region of Sakastan, and established "Satraps" in the region, one of them probably being Tanlis Mardates. These Parthian satraps ruled over Sakastan until the establishment of the dynasty of Gondophares (19-46 CE).

As a result of these invasions, the Suren family was may have been given control of Sakastan in order to defend the empire from further nomad incursions; the Surenids not only may have managed to repel the Indo-Scythians, but also to invade and seize their lands in Arachosia and Punjab, thus resulting in the establishment of the Indo-Parthian Kingdom.

Rule

Gondophares ascended the throne in c. 19 or c. 20, and quickly declared independence from the Parthian Empire, minting coins in Drangiana where he assumed the Greek title of autokrator ("one who rules by himself").

Gondophares I has traditionally been given a later date; the reign of one king calling himself Gondophares has been established at 20 AD by the rock inscription he set up at  Takht-i-Bahi near Mardan, Pakistan, in 46 AD., and he has also been connected with the third-century Acts of Thomas.

Gondophares I took over the Kabul valley and the Punjab and Sindh region area from the Scythian king Azes. In reality, a number of vassal rulers seem to have switched allegiance from the Indo-Scythians to Gondophares I. His empire was vast, but was only a loose framework, which fragmented soon after his death. His capital was the Gandharan city of Taxila. Taxila is located in Punjab to the west of the present Islamabad.

Chronology
On the coins of Gondophares, the royal names are Iranian, but the other legends of the coins are in Greek and Kharoṣṭhī.

Ernst Herzfeld maintained that the dynasty of Gondophares represented the House of Suren.

The Biblical Magus "Gaspar"
The name of Gondophares was translated in Armenian in "Gastaphar", and then in Western languages into "Gasbar[d], Gaspas, Caspus, Kaspar, גִזבָּר ". He may be the "Gasbar[d], Treasurer and King of Persia", who, according to apocryphal texts and eastern Christian tradition, was one of the three Biblical Magi who attended the birth of Christ. Through this interaction and association, Gaspar[d] was adopted by the Europeans (and in Western tradition) as a male first name.

Connection with Saint Thomas and Apollonius of Tyana

The apocryphical Acts of Thomas mentions one king Gudnaphar. This king has been associated with Gondophares I by scholars such as M. Reinaud, as it was not yet established that there were several kings with the same name. Since St. Thomas is said to have lived there in a specific time frame, this is often used to provide more specific chronology to an otherwise historiographically lacking time frame. Richard N. Frye, Emeritus Professor of Iranian Studies at Harvard University, has noted that this ruler has been identified with a king called Caspar in the Christian tradition of the Apostle St Thomas and his visit to India. Recent numismatic research by R.C. Senior supports the notion that the king who best fits these references was Gondophares-Sases, the fourth king using the title Gondophares.

A. D. H. Bivar, writing in The Cambridge History of Iran, said that the reign dates of one Gondophares recorded in the Takht-i Bahi inscription (20–46 or later AD) are consistent with the dates given in the Apocryphal Acts of Thomas for the Apostle's voyage to India following the Crucifixion in c. 30 AD. B. N. Puri, of the Department of Ancient Indian History and Archaeology, University of Lucknow, India, also identified Gondophares with the ruler said to have been converted by Saint Thomas the Apostle. The same goes for the reference to an Indo-Parthian king in the accounts of the life of Apollonius of Tyana. Puri says that the dates given by Philostratus in his Life of Apollonius of Tyana for Apollonius' visit to Taxila, 43–44 AD, are within the period of the reign of Gondophares I, who also went by the Parthian name, Phraotes.
Saint Thomas was brought before King Gundaphar (Gondophares) at his capital, Taxila. "Taxila" is the Greek form of the contemporary Pali name for the city, "Takkasila", from the Sanskrit "Taksha-sila". The name of the city was transformed in subsequent legends concerning Thomas, which were consolidated into the Historia Trium Regum (History of the Three Kings) by John of Hildesheim (1364–1375), into "Silla", "Egrisilla", "Grisculla", and so on, the name having undergone a process of metamorphosis similar to that which transformed "Vindapharnah" (Gondophares) to "Caspar". 
Hildesheim's Historia Trium Regum says: "In the third India is the kingdom of Tharsis, which at that time was ruled over by King Caspar, who offered incense to our Lord. The famous island Eyrisoulla [or Egrocilla] lies in this land: it is there that the holy apostle St Thomas is buried".  "Egrisilla" appears on the globe made in Nuremberg by Martin Behaim in 1492, where it appears on the southernmost part of the peninsula of Hoch India, "High India" or "India Superior", on the eastern side of the Sinus Magnus ("Great Gulf", the Gulf of Thailand): there Egrisilla is identified with the inscription, das lant wird genant egtisilla, ("the land called Egrisilla"). In his study of Behaim's globe, E. G. Ravenstein noted: "Egtisilla, or Eyrisculla [or Egrisilla: the letters "r" and "t" in the script on the globe look similar], is referred to in John of Hildesheim's version of the ‘Three Kings’ as an island where St. Thomas lies buried".

See also
Indo-Greek Kingdom
Indo-Scythians
Kushan Empire

References

Sources

Further reading

A. E. Medlycott, India and the Apostle Thomas, London 1905: Chapter i: "The Apostle Thomas and Gondophares the Indian king"
Coins of Gondophares
Indo-Parthian coinage

Indo-Parthian kings
1st-century monarchs in Asia
House of Suren
1st-century Iranian people
Zoroastrian rulers
49 deaths